Tolt may refer to:

 Tölt, a four-beat lateral ambling gait mainly found in Icelandic horses
 Tolt River, located in the western foothills of the Cascade Mountains, United States
 Tolt, a former name of Carnation, Washington

See also
 Tolt pipeline, located in Washington state, United States
Tolt Pipeline Trail